Too Hard to Swallow is the debut studio album by American hip hop duo UGK. It was released on November 10, 1992, by Jive Records.

Track listing

Sample credits
 "Something Good" contains samples from "Tell Me Something Good" performed by Rufus, and "Summer Breeze" performed by The Isley Brothers.
 "Use Me Up" contains a sample from "Use Me" performed by Bill Withers.
 "Pockets Full of Stones" contains samples from "Going Back to Cali" performed by LL Cool J, and "Gettin' Funky in the Joint" performed by Mellow Man Ace.
 "Cocaine in the Back of the Ride" contains a sample from "Freddie's Dead" performed by Curtis Mayfield.
 "Cramping My Style" contains samples from "Between the Sheets" performed by The Isley Brothers.
 "Feel Like I'm the One Who's Doin' Dope" contains a sample from "Mind Playing Tricks on Me" performed by The Geto Boys.
 "I'm So Bad" contains a sample from "I Turned You On" performed by The Isley Brothers.
 "976-Bun B" contains a sample from "Fly Like an Eagle" performed by Steve Miller Band.

Chart positions

References

1992 debut albums
UGK albums